The 9th Armoured Brigade was a British Army brigade formed during the Second World War.

The 9th Armoured Brigade was formed by the redesignation of the 4th Cavalry Brigade, a 1st Line Yeomanry (mounted) brigade in the Territorial Army, which had been part of the 1st Cavalry Division. It was converted to an armoured role on 3 August 1941 in the Middle East, and joined the 10th Armoured Division.

Second World War

El Alamein 
During the North Africa campaign, the Brigade was commanded by Brigadier J.C.Currie and fought at the Second Battle of El Alamein. Its units were:

 3rd Hussars
 Royal Wiltshire Yeomanry
 Warwickshire Yeomanry
 9th Armoured Brigade Signal Squadron (Middlesex Yeomanry), Royal Corps of Signals

The Brigade was nominally independent, but was placed under command of the 2nd New Zealand Division specifically for the El Alamein battle. Following permission given by the New Zealanders, they proudly painted the Kiwis' divisional sign on their tanks. The NZ infantry gained their objectives, but as with Operation Lightfoot on the first day of the battle, lanes could not be cleared through the minefields until night was almost over. 9th Armoured Brigade was forced to make its attack silhouetted by the early daylight. As dawn came on 2 November, tank after tank was hit by the German 88 mm guns that kept firing through seven air attacks. The 9th never reached their objective. In fact, they took 75 percent casualties and lost 102 of their 128 tanks. Nevertheless, they breached the gun line and the 1st Armoured Division of X Corps, under the command of Raymond Briggs, was now able to engage.

After the Brigade's action, Brigadier William Gentry of the 6th New Zealand Brigade went ahead to survey the scene. On seeing Brigadier Currie asleep on a stretcher, he approached him saying, 'Sorry to wake you John, but I'd like to know where your tanks are?' Currie waved his hand at a group of tanks around him, replying 'There they are.' Gentry was puzzled. 'I don't mean your headquarters tanks, I mean your armoured regiments. Where are they?' Currie waved his arm and again replied, 'There are my armoured regiments, Bill.'

Nevertheless, the assault of 2nd New Zealand Division had drawn in both 15 and 21 Panzer Divisions, with the result that there was a wide gap in the Axis lines to the south west. Through this gap, Lieutenant General Bernard Montgomery, commander of 8th Army, pushed the remainder of his armour, breaking the Afrika Korps line and pushing westwards into its rear areas and supply lines. By 4 November, the battle was won and Montgomery was entertaining the captured Afrika Korps commander, Wilhelm von Thoma, to dinner in his caravan.

In an account of the battle published to mark its 25th anniversary, Montgomery wrote:

I must mention the magnificent fight put up by 9th Armoured Brigade - 3rd Hussars, Wiltshire Yeomanry, Warwickshire Yeomanry.... If the British armour owed any debt to the infantry of 8th army, the debt was paid on 2 November by 9th Armoured Brigade in heroism and blood....

General Bernard Freyberg, the NZ Division's commander, also paid tribute to the gallant support provided by the brigade.

Post Alamein

After the battle, the 9th Armoured Brigade, which had been reduced to a handful of operational tanks, was withdrawn to Syria to regroup and undertake internal security duties. In 1944, the Brigade (with the same three constituent Regiments) fought in the Italian campaign in support of the British 78th, 4th Indian and 10th Indian Infantry Divisions.

Post War

After the reformation of the Territorial Army in 1947, the brigade was reformed as an independent formation within Northern Command. It was almost certainly disbanded by the time that the Territorial Army Volunteer Reserve was formed in 1967.

See also

 British armoured formations of World War II
 List of British brigades of the Second World War

Notes

References
Graham Watson, United Kingdom: The Territorial Army 1947, v 1.0, 10 March 2002

Further reading
During Operation Supercharge (the battle of El Alamein):

Field Marshal Lord Carver, El Alamein Wordsworth Editions Ltd; New Ed edition, 2000
Hector Bolitho, The Galloping Third: The story of the 3rd the King's Own Hussars, 1963

Armoured brigades of the British Army
Military units and formations established in 1941
Armoured brigades of the British Army in World War II